Eugenius (died 394) was a 4th-century Roman emperor.

Eugenius may also refer to:

People 
Eugenius (Antioch), a Roman usurper, during the rule of Diocletian
Eugenius, a Coptic saint – see Eugenius, Eugander, and Abilandius
Eugenius, character in Laurence Sterne's novel The Life and Opinions of Tristram Shandy, Gentleman
Eugene of Palermo, Sicilian admiral
Eugenius of Carthage, canonised bishop of Carthage
Eugenius I of Byzantium, Bishop of Byzantium from 237 to 242
Eugenius I of Toledo (died 647), Archbishop of Toledo from 636 to 647
Eugenius II of Toledo (died 657), Archbishop of Toledo from 647 to 657
Owain ap Dyfnwal (fl. 934), King of the Cumbrians
Owain ap Dyfnwal (died 1015), King of the Cumbrians
Owain Foel (fl. 1018), King of the Cumbrians
Patriarch Eugenius II of Constantinople (1780–1822), Patriarch of Constantinople from 1821 to 1822
Eugenius Roche (1786–1829), Anglo-French journalist and poet
Eugenius Birch (1818–1884), English architect
Eugenius Warming (1841–1924), Danish botanist

Popes
Four popes have been named Eugenius:
Pope Eugenius I (654–657)
Pope Eugenius II (824-827)
Pope Eugenius III (1145–1153)
Pope Eugenius IV (1431–1447)

Other uses 
Eugenius (band), a Scottish rock band
Eugenius!, a musical

See also
Eugenia (disambiguation)
Eugene (disambiguation)